Patriarch Neophytus of Constantinople may refer to:

 Neophytus I of Constantinople, Ecumenical Patriarch in 1153
 Neophytus II of Constantinople, Ecumenical Patriarch in 1597–1602, 1602–1603 and 1607–1612
 Neophytus III of Constantinople, Ecumenical Patriarch in 1636–1637
 Neophytus IV of Constantinople, Ecumenical Patriarch in 1688
 Neophytus V of Constantinople, Ecumenical Patriarch in 1707
 Neophytus VI of Constantinople, Ecumenical Patriarch in 1734–1740 and 1743–1744
 Neophytus VII of Constantinople, Ecumenical Patriarch in 1789–1794 and 1798–1801
 Neophytus VIII of Constantinople, Ecumenical Patriarch in 1891–1894